Taseyevo is a rural locality (a selo) and the administrative center of Taseyevsky District in Krasnoyarsk Krai, Russia. Population: 

Taseyevo still has the communal layout of the Soviet era, with houses closely spaced together and farm land further out. During Soviet times, it used to have factories for soda, bread, and bricks.

Taseyevo is one of the locations where the Soviets deported people starting in the 1930s, including from Latvia and Lithuania, forcing them to stay there for at least twenty years.

References

Rural localities in Krasnoyarsk Krai
Taseyevsky District
Yeniseysk Governorate